François Gagnon (April 18, 1922 – May 4, 2017) was a Canadian politician from Quebec.

Background

He was born on April 18, 1922 in Cap-Chat, Quebec and was a public servant.

Member of the legislature

Gagnon won a seat to the Legislative Assembly of Quebec in the 1962 provincial election in the district of Gaspé-Nord.  He supported the Union Nationale and was re-elected in the 1966 election.  He was parliamentary assistant from 1966 to 1969.

Cabinet Member

Gagnon was appointed to the Cabinet, serving as Minister responsible for Public Works from 1969 to 1970.  He was re-elected in 1970, but did not run for re-election in 1973.

Mayor

He was Mayor of Cap-Chat from 1976 to 1977 and from 1981 to 1985.

Political comeback

Gagnon considered a political comeback with the Parti Québécois in the 1976 provincial election and with the Progressive Conservatives in the 1984 federal election, but eventually declined each time.

References

1922 births
2017 deaths
French Quebecers
Mayors of places in Quebec
Union Nationale (Quebec) MNAs